Punjwarian is a village of Kharian, Punjab, Pakistan situated on GT Road Sarai Alamgir. It is about 12 km away from the main city of Kharian. It is located near by KHARIAN CANTT.
Awan (malik's) are the founder & main caste of the village.

Language
As per national census of 1998 Punjabi is the main language of Sarai Alamgir is spoken by 94% population. Urdu, the national language, is spoken widely while English spoken by educated elite.

Facilities
 Govt. Primary Schools (for boys)
 Govt. Primary School  (for girls)
 Barlas public model school ( co education )

Castes
 Butt (Bhatti)
 Durrani

 Jatt

 Malik
 Mughal Barlas

Religion

 Islam almost 100% followers

Agriculture

Most people have agriculture businesses here which are the backbone of the economy.

Main Crops
 Wheat
 Corn
 Rice
 Sugarcane
 Vegetables 
 Fruit

External links
Punjwarian Map

Populated places in Gujrat District